Leeville may refer to:

Leeville, New South Wales
Leeville, Tennessee
Leeville, Louisiana

See also
Leesville (disambiguation)